Armando Escobar Díaz (born 27 August 1993) is a Mexican professional footballer who plays as a defender.

Honours
Atlante
Liga de Expansión MX: Apertura 2021, Apertura 2022
Campeón de Campeones: 2022

References

1993 births
Living people
Mexican footballers
Association football defenders
Tampico Madero F.C. footballers
Alebrijes de Oaxaca players
Atlante F.C. footballers
Ascenso MX players
Liga Premier de México players
Tercera División de México players
Footballers from Veracruz
People from Xalapa